The 1938 Connecticut State Huskies football team represented Connecticut State College, now the University of Connecticut, in the 1938 college football season.  The Huskies were led by fifth-year head coach J. Orlean Christian and completed the season with a record of 4–3.

Schedule

References

Connecticut State
UConn Huskies football seasons
Connecticut State Huskies football